The  is a professional tennis tournament played on indoor carpet courts founded as the All Japan Indoors in 1964. It is currently part of the International Tennis Federation (ITF) ITF Women's World Tennis Tour. From 1997 to 2018, it was part of the Association of Tennis Professionals (ATP) Challenger Tour. It is held annually in Kyoto, Japan, since 1997.

Past finals

Men's singles

Women's singles

Men's doubles

Women's doubles

References

External links
Official website (in japanese)

 
ATP Challenger Tour
ITF Women's World Tennis Tour
Recurring sporting events established in 1997
Tennis tournaments in Japan
Hard court tennis tournaments
Sports competitions in Kyoto